The Laban ng Demokratikong Pilipino is a liberal political party in the Philippines.

There are no results available for the 2004 election for the House of Representatives, but according to the website of the House, the party held 7 out of 235 seats. The party is divided into two factions. The faction led by Edgardo Angara contested in the 2004 elections as a member party of the Koalisyon ng Nagkakaisang Pilipino (Coalition of United Filipinos).

In the May 14, 2007 national elections, the party won 3 seats in the House of Representatives.

History
In the mid-1980s, the Partido Demokratiko Pilipino, Lakas ng Bayan (LABAN) and Lakas ng Bansa parties became members of the United Nationalist Democratic Organization (UNIDO) coalition that supported the candidacy of Corazon C. Aquino and Salvador H. Laurel for president and vice president, respectively in the February 7, 1986 snap election. By early 1986, PDP had merged with LABAN, founded in 1978 by the late Senator Benigno Aquino Jr., to form the PDP–Laban.

In the 1987 legislative elections, UNIDO, under the name "Lakas ng Bayan", became the dominant party in both houses of Congress, electing Representative Ramon V. Mitra, Jr. of Palawan as Speaker of the House of Representatives. UNIDO would be dissolved soon after.

In September 1988, PDP–Laban was split into two factions: the Pimentel Wing of Aquilino Q. Pimentel, Jr. and the Cojuangco Wing of Jose "Peping" S. Cojuangco, Jr. The Cojuangco Wing and the Lakas ng Bansa party of Speaker Mitra merged on September 16, 1988 to form the Laban ng Demokratikong Pilipino party, while the Pimentel Wing remained as the PDP–Laban party. In the November 1991 LDP National Convention, the party nominated Speaker Mitra as its nominee for President of the Philippines, while runner-up former National Defense Secretary Fidel V. Ramos bolted the party and formed Partido Lakas ng Tao, and won the presidency in the May 11, 1992 presidential election.

In 1994, LDP formed a major coalition with Lakas–NUCD of President Ramos (dubbed as the "Lakas-Laban Coalition") for the May 1995 midterm legislative elections, winning a majority of all seats in both houses of Congress.

In 1997, the party supported the candidacy of then-Vice President Joseph Estrada for the presidency, coalesced with two other parties to form the Laban ng Makabayang Masang Pilipino.

Recent events
In the 2004 elections, the party was critically divided by two factions between its party president Senator Edgardo Angara, who supported the candidacy of party outsider actor Fernando Poe Jr., and party secretary general Makati representative Agapito Aquino, who supported Senator Panfilo Lacson's candidacy for president.

It was planned that the LDP would form the core of the main opposition coalition, the Koalisyon ng Nagkakaisang Pilipino (KNP). However, members of the party disagreed on which person to support for president. Panfilo Lacson, a member of the party, advanced his candidacy for president but was not considered by Edgardo Angara, the president of the party. Angara supported Fernando Poe, Jr. Together with the party's secretary-general Agapito "Butz" Aquino, Lacson gathered the support of some members of the party and went ahead with his candidacy. The LDP was subsequently polarized between those supporting Angara and Poe, and those for Lacson and Aquino.

By then, Poe and Lacson have both filed their certificates of candidacies. According to the rules of candidacy, every presidential candidate must have a political party to back him or her. With the obvious split within the ranks of the LDP, and with no signs that the two factions would come to an agreement, the COMELEC decided to informally split the party into the Aquino and the Angara wings. Lacson then ran under the LDP – Aquino Wing, and Poe under the LDP – Angara Wing, which would later become the KNP.

During the campaign period, there had been numerous unification talks between the two factions. The opposition saw the need to become united under one banner to boost their chances of winning the presidential election against the organized political machinery of Arroyo. The plans of unification did not materialize due to the stubbornness of both Poe and Lacson. Lacson wanted Poe to concede to him and run as his vice-presidential candidate while the supporters of Poe wanted Lacson to back-out from his candidacy and instead support Poe, citing his low performance in the surveys.

Party officials 

National President: Bellaflor Angara-Castillo
Chairman: Sonny Angara
 Secretary-General: Representative: Arthur Angara

Current members 

 Arthur Angara – Baler Mayor (1992–2001; 2004–2013)
 Rommel Angara – Vice Governor of Aurora (2013–2019) and Congressman of Aurora Province's Lone District (2019–present)
 Sonny Angara – senator (2013–present) and Congressman of Aurora Province's Lone District (2004–2013)
 Bellaflor Angara-Castillo – Governor of Aurora (2004–2013)

Notable members
Ramon V. Mitra, Jr. – former House Speaker and party's Standard-bearer during the 1992 elections.
Ret. Gen. Fidel V. Ramos – former president, lost the party's nomination to the House Speaker Ramon Mitra and formed his own party, Lakas ng Tao, now named Lakas-CMD.
Jose "Peping" Cojuangco, Jr. – one of the original founders, left the party in 1997 together with Gloria Macapagal Arroyo to form Kabalikat ng Malayang Pilipino (Kampi). He is also the appointed as secretary-general of PDP–Laban until 2016, when he supported Vice President Jejomar Binay's presidential campaign. 
Neptali Gonzales – former Senate President.
Edgardo Angara – present party president, former Senate President and four-term senator; the longest-serving senator in the post-EDSA Congress
Jamby Madrigal – former senator, LDP member from 2001 to 2007 before joining PDP–Laban
Blas Ople – former senator, Secretary of Foreign Affairs.
Gloria Macapagal Arroyo – former President of the Philippines. She quit the party in early 1997 to form her own political party, Kampi. 
Vicente Sotto III – former senator, LDP member from 1992 to 1997 and left together with Arroyo to form Kampi.  However, during the Estrada administration he returned to the party before and left again in 2007 to join the Nationalist People's Coalition. 
Ramon Revilla Sr. – former senator, LDP member from 1992 to 1997 before joining Lakas for the 1998 elections.
Raul Roco – Congressman, former senator, left the party in 1997 and formed his own party Aksyon Demokratiko (Aksyon) for the 1998 and 2004 elections.
Teresa Aquino-Oreta – former senator, LDP member from 1988 to 2007 before joining Nationalist People's Coalition.
Rodolfo Biazon – Congressman, former senator, erstwhile party stalwart before joining the Liberal Party of the Philippines in the 2004 elections.
Heherson Alvarez– former senator and congressman from Isabela's 4th District.
Leticia Ramos-Shahani– former senator, Senate President pro tempore of the Philippines, was a LDP member before moving to Lakas in 1991 that formed by his brother Fidel V. Ramos after losing to get the nomination.
Agapito "Butz" Aquino– former senator and Deputy Speaker of the House of Representatives of the Philippines.
Francisco Tatad – former senator, LDP member from 1995 to 1998.
Joey Lina– former senator, LDP member from 1988 to 1995.
Orlando "Orly" Mercado – former senator and Senate Majority Leader, original co-founders of LDP and member from 1988 to 1998.
Freddie Webb - Congressman from Parañaque's Lone District and a Senator for one term. 
Teofisto Guingona, Jr. – former vice-president, used to be with LDP before he was appointed as Justice Secretary during the Ramos Administration. 
Panfilo Lacson – longtime senator (2001–2013; 2016–2022), and former Chief of the Philippine National Police (1998–2001).
Marcelo Fernan – former Senate President.
Oscar Orbos – former Congressman and representative of Pangasinan's 1st district
Maria Clara Lobregat – 3-term Congresswoman and Mayor of Zamboanga City
Celso Lobregat – 2 term Congressman and Mayor of Zamboanga City
Jose E. Calingasan – Congressman, 4th District of Batangas, most outstanding Congressmen in the History of Batangas, also a former Philippine ambassador
Alberto Romulo – former senator, Senate Majority Leader, and Secretary of Foreign Affairs.
Ernesto Herrera – Congressman and former senator, LDP member from 1992 to 2001, later he returned again from 2004 until his death in 2015.

Electoral performance

Presidential and vice presidential elections

Legislative elections

References

Centrist parties in the Philippines
Conservative liberal parties
Liberal parties in the Philippines
Political parties established in 1988
1988 establishments in the Philippines